The Last Wedding is a 1995 Finnish comedy film directed by Markku Pölönen. The film was selected as the Finnish entry for the Best Foreign Language Film at the 68th Academy Awards, but was not accepted as a nominee.

Cast
 Martti Suosalo as Pekka
 Henrika Andersson as Meeri
 Matti Varjo as Eljas
 Tanja Kortelainen as Jaana
 Jarmo Mäkinen as The Rockroller
 Rauha Valkonen as Linnea

See also
 List of submissions to the 68th Academy Awards for Best Foreign Language Film
 List of Finnish submissions for the Academy Award for Best Foreign Language Film

References

External links
 

1995 films
1995 comedy films
Finnish comedy films
1990s Finnish-language films
Films directed by Markku Pölönen